Makalu Air Pvt. Ltd is an airline based in Nepalgunj, Nepal. The company was established in 2009 and was issued an air operator's certificate by the Civil Aviation Authority of Nepal. Makalu Air provides chartered passenger and cargo services.

Destinations 
The airline serves the following destinations:

Fleet
The Makalu Air fleet consists of the following aircraft (as of August 2018):

Accidents and incidents 
 On 21 November 2011 a Makalu Air Cessna 208B Grand Caravan took off from Surkhet, en route to Talcha. Upon touchdown at Talcha, the aircraft skidded off the runway and hit a rock, damaging the front of the aircraft. Four of the 11 occupants were injured.
 On 4 August 2016 a Makalu Air Cessna 208B Grand Caravan took off from Simikot, en route to Surkhet. After experiencing engine failure whilst climbing, the aircraft was forced to land in the Karnali river. Both pilots survived uninjured.
 On 16 May 2018 a Makalu Air Cessna 208B Grand Caravan, operating a cargo flight, took off for Simikot, from Surkhet. The aircraft crashed near Simikot pass. Neither of the two pilots survived.

See also 
List of airlines of Nepal

References 

Airlines of Nepal
Airlines established in 2009
2009 establishments in Nepal